Jacksonville, Florida is served by local media, as well as regional and national media. As of 2017, Jacksonville is ranked as the 42nd largest television media market in the United States, with 700,890 homes. Radio and television broadcasts are governed by the FCC.

Print media

The Florida Times-Union is the major daily newspaper in Jacksonville. Jacksonville.com is its official website. It is owned by GateHouse Media, which also publishes the Georgia Times-Union for southeast Georgia residents. Financial News & Daily Record is another daily paper focused on the business and legal communities. The Jacksonville Business Journal is a weekly American City Business Journals publication focused on business news. Folio Weekly is the city's largest alternative weekly. The Florida Star is the city's oldest African-American focused paper. Jacksonville Free Press is another weekly catering to the black community. Metro Jacksonville is an online publication.

Television
Jacksonville is the 42nd largest local television market in the United States, and is served by television stations affiliated with all the major American networks. The Jacksonville designated market area has the distinction of being the only United States television market in which affiliates of all four major broadcast networks are involved in both virtual and legal duopolies (Gannett Company owns WJXX and WTLV outright, while Cox Media Group owns WFOX-TV and operates WJAX-TV through joint sales and shared services agreements with Bayshore Television). WJXT is a former longtime CBS affiliate that turned independent in 2002. WJCT is the local PBS station. WUFT-TV is another PBS affiliate available in the Jacksonville area on cable through Comcast although originating in Gainesville, FL. The Jacksonville television market serves Northeastern Florida and Southeastern Georgia.

Radio

Jacksonville is the 48th largest local radio market in the United States, and is dominated by the same two large ownership groups that dominate the radio industry across the United States: Cox Radio and Clear Channel Communications. There are a total of 39 FM radio stations ranging from Alternative Rock, Top 40, News and Information, Hip-Hop & R&B, Country and more. There are 20 AM radio stations ranging from News and Information, Foreign Language music and talk and more.

FM stations

AM stations

Online media
Jacksonville.com is the online edition of the Florida Times-Union. Each of the television stations that offer a news program also has a website for news. 

The Coastal, a magazine geared toward young professionals in the area, launched online in late 2015 before expanding to print.

See also
 Florida media
List of newspapers in Florida
 List of radio stations in Florida
 List of television stations in Florida
 Media of cities in Florida
 Fort Lauderdale, Gainesville, Key West, Lakeland, Miami, Orlando, St. Petersburg, Tallahassee, Tampa

References

Bibliography

External links
  (Directory ceased in 2017)
 

 
Jacksonville